CBE may refer to:

Travel
 CBE, IATA code for Greater Cumberland Regional Airport.
 CBE, ICAO code for Aerocaribe, airline based in Cancun, Mexico.
 CBE, Railway code for Coimbatore Junction
 Cross Bronx Expressway, a major freeway in the New York City borough of the Bronx.

Communications
 CBE, the former callsign of the CBC Radio One AM station in Windsor, Ontario.
 CBE-FM, callsign of the CBC Radio Two FM station in Windsor, Ontario.

Banking
 The Central Bank of Egypt, the central (or reserve) bank in Egypt.
 Commercial Bank of Ethiopia, an Ethiopian bank founded in 1963.

Education
 CBE, Competency-based education, another term for Competency-based learning
 Calgary Board of Education, public school board for the city of Calgary, Alberta.

Science
 Cannabielsoin, a component of cannabis
 Carbon Balance Error, the error in accounting for Carbon in a mass balance
 Cat-back exhaust, a type of automotive exhaust.
 Cell Broadband Engine, a multi-core general purpose CPU developed jointly by Sony, Toshiba and IBM.
 Center for the Built Environment, a research institution at UC, Berkeley.
 Chemical beam epitaxy, a thin film growth method using beams of molecules.
 Chemical and Biochemical Engineering, a branch of engineering dealing with the physical and life sciences.
 College of Built Environments, University of Washington, Seattle, Washington.
 CBE, International Meteor Organization designation for meteor shower Coma Berenicids.
 Collisionless Boltzmann equation in plasma physics and gravitational dynamics.
 Common Base Event, a computing term referring to IBM's implementation of the Web Services Distributed Management (WSDM) Event Format standard.
 Council of Biology Editors, a former name of the Council of Science Editors, who publish the CBE style guide.
 Current Best Estimate, a common expression of related to the highest fidelity value known at the time.

Honours
 Commander of the Most Excellent Order of the British Empire, a grade within the British order of chivalry.
 Conqueror of the British Empire, a self-awarded title of the Ugandan dictator, Idi Amin.

Sports
 Brazilian Fencing Confederation, or Confederação Brasileira de Esgrima
 College Basketball Experience Classic (CBE Classic), pre-season college basketball tournament.
 Civilization: Beyond Earth, a 2014 video game

Religion
 Christians for Biblical Equality, a Christian organization primarily focused on advocating gender equality.
 Congregation Beth Elohim, a Reform synagogue in Brooklyn, New York founded in 1861